The 2012–13 CEV Champions League was the 54th edition of the highest level European volleyball club competition organised by the European Volleyball Confederation.

Participating teams

League round
28 teams were drawn to 7 pools of 4 teams each.
The 1st + the best 5 ranked with the best score qualified for the Playoff 12
The organizer of the Final Four were determined after the end of the League Round and qualified directly for the Final Four.
The team of the organizer of the Final Four was replaced by the next 2nd ranked team with the best score.
The remaining second-placed teams as well 3 third ranked teams with the best score moved to the Challenge Round of the CEV Cup
The remaining 3rd placed and all 4th placed teams were eliminated.

All times are local.

Pool A

|}

|}

Pool B

|}

|}

Pool C

|}

|}

Pool D

|}

|}

Pool E

|}

|}

Pool F

|}

|}

Pool G

|}

|}

Playoffs

Playoff 12

|}

First leg

|}

Second leg

|}

Playoff 6

|}

First leg

|}

Second leg

|}

Final Four
Organizer:  Lokomotiv Novosibirsk
 Place: Omsk
All times are Omsk Time (UTC+07:00).

Semifinals

|}

3rd place match

|}

Final

|}

Final standings

Awards

Most Valuable Player
  Marcus Nilsson (Lokomotiv Novosibirsk)
Best Scorer
  Marcus Nilsson (Lokomotiv Novosibirsk)
Best Spiker
  Antonin Rouzier (ZAKSA Kędzierzyn-Koźle) 
Best Server
  Luiz Felipe Fonteles (ZAKSA Kędzierzyn-Koźle) 

Best Blocker
  David Lee (Zenit Kazan)
Best Receiver
  Yury Berezhko (Zenit Kazan)
Best Libero
  Daniele De Pandis (Bre Banca Lannutti Cuneo)
Best Setter
  Aleksandr Butko (Lokomotiv Novosibirsk)

External links
 2013 CEV Volleyball Champions League

CEV Champions League
2012 in volleyball
2013 in volleyball